Eva Tylová (born 1959, Prague, Czechoslovakia) is Czech environmentalist and politician.

She was Czech deputy minister of environment (1998-2002) a director of Czech environmental inspection (ČIZP) in 2002-3 and from 2007. Tylová is member of the Czech Green Party (Strana zelených) since 2005 a vicechairman of the Společnost pro trvale udržitelný život (Society for Sustainable Living).

In 2022, she was again elected as a Representative of the capital city of Prague, as a non-partisan for the Pirates - officially The Czech Pirate Party (in Czech: Česká pirátská strana; liberal progressive political party in the Czech Republic, founded in 2009).

External links
Eva Tylová 

1959 births
Living people
Politicians from Prague
20th-century Czech women politicians
Green Party (Czech Republic) Government ministers
21st-century Czech women politicians
Czech Technical University in Prague alumni